A spiegeltent (Dutch for "mirror tent", from spiegel+tent) is a large travelling tent, constructed from wood and canvas and decorated with mirrors and stained glass, intended as an entertainment venue. Originally built in Belgium during the late 19th and early 20th centuries, only a handful of these spiegeltents remain in existence today, and these survivors continue to travel around Europe and beyond, often as a feature attraction at various international arts festivals. Two tents used by Teatro ZinZanni have been in (more or less) fixed locations in Seattle and San Francisco for several years. The Melba Spiegeltent spent the better part of a century touring Europe, but is now permanently located in Melbourne, Australia. The Famous Spiegeltent, built in 1920, is now owned by Australian jazz piano player David Bates.

On 1 April 2011, Spiegelworld opened Absinthe at Caesars Palace, Paradise, Nevada in the 26-metre Salon Marlene spiegeltent.  In 2007, the first spiegeltent arrived in Africa and toured South Africa as part of Madame Zingara's Theatre of Dreams dinner circus extravaganza.

Origins and history

The original spiegeltents were constructed in the Flemish Region of Belgium in the late 19th century as mobile dance halls. They were transported around the country and assembled for town fairs in areas that did not have a proper dance hall.

Older

De Parel Spiegeltent - 1905 Belgian tent, purchased as a venue for the Perth Fringe World. Previously known as the ‘De Parel Van Vuren’ (‘The Pearl Of Fire’). Built by Belgium's renowned Klessens family, it is 18 metres in diameter and holds up to 350 people.
The Melba Spiegeltent - 1910 Belgian tent, now based in Melbourne and owned by Circus Oz. Holds 250 people.
Palais Romantique - an Art Deco spiegeltent which is 17 metres in diameter and holds 300 people.
Palais Nostalgique - 1920 currently used for a standing show in San Francisco, California.  Holds 295 people.
Le Moulin Rouge - 1910 currently used for a standing show in Seattle, Washington.  Holds 295 people.
Tivoli - 1920 Klessens Family - travelling tent
La Gayola - an Art Deco spiegeltent 1947 which holds 350 people.
La Gaieté - an original Klessens tent 1932, 16 diameter, which holds 300 people
Ideal - an Art Nouveau spiegeltent, handmade 1948, which holds 320 people.
The Famous Spiegeltent
Idolize - One of a kind spiegeltent in Baroque style with a capacity of 450 guests.

Newer

Aurora - holding up to 800 people and 24 metres in diameter. Art Deco.
Palais des Glaces, 22 diameter, Art Nouveau 1992. Capacity: Up to 300 people.
Salon Revue 22 diameter, Art Nouveau 2006
Bon Vivant - Nostalgic dance hall in Art Nouveau style.
Kempisch Danspaleis - mirrored dance tent.
Cristal Palace - 18 metres in diameter for up to 400 people.
Carrousel - Interior in oak. Capacity : up to 300 people for dinner.
De Lust - A rectangular mirror tent for up to 500 people.
Salon Perdu - 20 diameter in Jugendstil stile; holds up to 550 people.
Deluxe - One of the smallest spiegeltents. Capacity: 225 guests.
Paradiso- Exceptional tent in Jugendstil stile, diameter 24 metres, capacity: 800 guests
Victoria - One of the most luxurious mirror tents. 25m diameter, 1000 people standing, 600 seated and 420 seated for dinner.

The Melba Spiegeltent (Melbourne, Australia)

History 
Built in Belgium in 1910 by mirror designer Oscar Mols Dom and tent maker Louis Goor, The Melba Spiegeltent spent almost a century travelling across Europe. Originally called The Bacaladera, the tent saw performances including Edith Piaf and Kurt Weil.

Frank Gasser, widely regarded as the godfather of circus and carnival entertainment in Australia, had long admired the beauty of the Spiegeltents and was desperate for one of his own. His dream came true when he met Vita Sachtler in 2006, who had acquired the Spiegeltent as a deal in a barter. While in Germany chasing up a debt, the client had no money to offer but offered the Bacaladera Spiegeltent in exchange, which had been stored in old shed in the middle of the Black Forest. An agreement was made and the Spiegeltent was restored and re-introduced to the touring circuit running a show called Palais Des Fous in Germany.

When Gasser met Sachtler he could not believe his good fortune, as she was prepared to sell, and after nearly a century of traveling Europe from festival to festival, The Bacaladera found a home in Melbourne. Gasser performed some restoration work, updated the façade and renamed her "The Melba Spiegeltent", after the Australian opera soprano Dame Nellie Melba.

Current use 
The Melba Spiegeltent is now permanently situated within the Collingwood Arts Precinct at the home of Circus Oz, and hosts events including circus, cabaret, comedy, theatre, live music and festivals. Performances have included Missy Higgins, Uncle Jack Charles and Lawrence Leung.

In 2018, The Melba won Best Venue at the Melbourne Fringe Festival.

The Famous Spiegeltent

History
The Famous Spiegeltent, perhaps the most lavishly decorated of all, was built in 1920 in Belgium by master craftsmen Oscar Mols Dom and Louis Goor. Over the decades it has hosted some of the world's greatest performing artists, including German singer Marlene Dietrich, who famously performed "Falling in Love Again" in it during the 1930s.

Construction
The Famous Spiegeltent is transported from venue to venue in shipping containers, and is constructed on site at each location. It consists of about 3,000 pieces of wood, mirrors, canvas and stained glass, and is then detailed in velvet and brocade. It requires about 12 people to construct the  round venue,

The Famous Spiegeltent can hold an audience of about 316 people.

Current use

The Famous Spiegeltent is  owned and managed by Australian jazz pianist and theatrical producer David Bates, who first utilised the tent as a venue at the 1996 Edinburgh Festival Fringe. After a successful visit to the Adelaide Fringe Festival in 2000, Bates bought the tent from previous owners Scottish & Newcastle and set it up as a unique travelling venue. It is a regular venue for Adelaide Fringe performances, usually within the venue cluster known as "The Garden of Unearthly Delights" in Rundle Park, Adelaide, and was used for the Adelaide Cabaret Festival in 2019. It still regularly tours Australia and goes to Edinburgh each year.

Other spiegeltents
The  is a "Magic Mirrors" spiegeltent located in the Parc de la Villette, at 59, boulevard Macdonald, in the 19th arrondissement of Paris, near the metro station of Porte de la Villette. The Cabaret Sauvage was created by Méziane Azaïche and inaugurated in December 1997.

Magic Mirrors Le Havre is a spiegeltent in Le Havre, France. Since 2010, this spiegeltent, made of wood and canvas, has been the venue for a variety of events, including music concerts, festivals, meetings, charity events, receptions, and many others, around 120 dates a year. Designed in the style of a ballroom of the roaring twenties, the decor is in art nouveau style.  Its capacity is 950 people standing, and 550 people sitting, with a flexible interior which can cater for a variety of event types. This spiegeltent hosts around 60,000 people a year.

Magic Mirrors Istres spigeltent was a major investment of the Istrian project for Marseille Provence 2013. In 2015, it was revamped with a new facade.

Le MeM is a "Magic Mirrors" spiegeltent in Rennes, France. It has 1500 seats, and open-air café with a bar and catering service developed by Michelin-starred chef Julien Lemarié. In 2019, it opened for the festival of Big Love and the Transat festival.

La Estacion in Madrid has a large "Magic Mirrors" spiegeltent, located in one of the disused wings of Príncipe Pío Station. It has been a cultural and leisure attraction for the people of Madrid since 2017, with a wide range of entertainment, including a theatre programme and concerts as well as restaurants. The Gran Teatro Príncipe Pío has different spaces, including a theatre with capacity for around 1,600 spectators, which will also be used as a concert hall.

Spiegeltent Tours 
 Delyria -  the first circus show produced in Mexico. Hosted in a "Magic Mirrors" spiegeltent in Monterrey and Puebla, Mexico.
 Absinthe - a show produced by Spiegelworld. Toured in 2015 - 2016 with a "Magic Mirrors" Spiegeltent in the US, Australia and New Zealand.
 Empire - a show produced by Spiegelworld, premiered in New York City in May 2012. Presented in a "Magic Mirrors" spiegeltent located on an unused car park in Times Square.

References

External links
 
 Spiegelworld
 Magic Mirrors, makers of spiegeltents

Tents
Cabaret